Xenosaurus platyceps, the flathead knob-scaled lizard, is a lizard found in the Sierra Madre Oriental of Mexico. Its natural habitat is dry scrub forest and oak savanna. The species is endangered due to habitat fragmentation for the development of tourism and agriculture as well as predation by feral cats. Currently, the flathead knob-scaled lizard does not live in a protected area.

References

Xenosauridae
Reptiles described in 1968
Endemic reptiles of Mexico
Fauna of the Sierra Madre Oriental